Porta Portese is an ancient city gate, located at the end of Via Portuense, where it meets Via Porta Portese, about a block from the banks of the Tiber in the southern edge of the Rione Trastevere of Rome, Italy.

History
The gate was built in 1644 as part of the Janiculum Walls which replaced the Porta Portuensis. The gate and walls were built by Vincenzo Maculani; commissioned by Pope Urban VIII. Just outside the gate, a large arsenal was erected by Clement XI starting from 1714.

Until the late 19th century, the Ripa Grande port (then the main river port of the city) was located nearby. The Via Portuensis starts from it, which originally connected the city to Portus.

A popular flea market is held every Sunday in the area of Porta Portese.

See also 

Papal Navy

References

External links

Portese
Rome R. XIII Trastevere
Rome Q. XI Portuense
Rome Q. XII Gianicolense
1644 establishments in Italy